Yamar may refer to:

Yamar Samb (born 1952), Senegalese basketball player

See also
Yamari, a yidam or meditation deity of the Anuttara Yoga Tantra method (father) classification